Terence Wilmot Hutchison FBA (13 August 1912 – 6 October 2007) was an economist and economic historian.

Early years 
The son of Robert Langton Douglas, Hutchison was born in Bournemouth and was educated at Tonbridge School. Remaining unaware of his father's identity until his teens, he was a half-brother to Marshal of the Royal Air Force William Sholto Douglas, 1st Baron Douglas of Kirtleside. His Australian mother, Grace Hutchison (1870–1935), brought him up in the Christian Scientist faith.

Hutchison attended Peterhouse, Cambridge in 1931 to study the classics but switched to economics, taking his bachelor of arts degree, with first class honours, in 1934. Subsequently, he spent a year at the London School of Economics (LSE), then became a lecturer in economics in Bonn, Germany in 1935, due to an interest in Ludwig Wittgenstein. He spent approximately three years in Bonn, learning the German language while researching German studies in economics.

Following a brief period in Vienna, Hutchison moved to Baghdad in 1938 to take up a position at a teacher training college. The installation of a pro-Nazi regime in Iraq in 1941 prompted him to move to Bombay, where he joined the Indian Army as an intelligence officer, serving initially on the Northwest Frontier, then in Egypt and finally in Delhi.

University career 
In 1946, he began his British university career with a position at the University of Hull. After a year at Hull, he moved to the LSE, where he became interested in the history of economics. The University of Birmingham named him  Mitsui Professor of Economics in 1956, holding that position he held until he retired in 1978. He continued to teach the history of economics for another two years.

After retiring, Hutchison published the book Before Adam Smith in 1988, the first book in English to systematically analyze 18th Century economic writing before the publication of Adam Smith's seminal work The Wealth of Nations (1776).

Personal life 
Hutchison married the German national Loretta Hack, a student in Bonn, in 1935. She died in 1981. In 1983, he married the American academic Christine Donaldson, who died in 2003. He had three children.

Selected publications
 Terence W. Hutchison, 1938. The Significance and Basic Postulates of Economic Theory, Macmillan. This work established his credentials as an economic methodologist.
 _, 1941.  "The Significance and Basic Postulates of Economic Theory: A Reply to Professor Knight," Journal of Political Economy, 49(5), pp. 732-750.  
 _, 1953. A Review of Economic Doctrines 1870-1929, Oxford), 
 _, 2000. On the Methodology of Economics and the Formalist Revolution, Edward Elgar.  Description and preview.
 Frank H. Knight, 1940. "'What is Truth' in Economics," [article review of  Hutchison, 1938] Journal of Political Economy, 48(1), pp. 1–32.  Reprinted in Selected Essays by Frank H. Knight: "What is Truth" in Economics?, University of Chicago Press, pp. 372-399.

Archives 
Papers related to Hutchison's career are held at the Cadbury Research Library, University of Birmingham.

References

External links
 Terence W. Hutchison, 1912-: biopic and major published works from the New School

British economists
1912 births
2007 deaths
Alumni of Peterhouse, Cambridge
Fellows of the British Academy
Writers from Bournemouth